This is a list of notable events in music that took place in the year 1938.

Specific locations
1938 in British music
1938 in Norwegian music

Specific genres
1938 in country music
1938 in jazz

Events
January 16
Benny Goodman plays the first jazz concert at Carnegie Hall in New York City, considered a legitimisation of the genre. It is recorded live and issued in 1950 as The Famous 1938 Carnegie Hall Jazz Concert.
Béla Bartók's Sonata for two pianos and percussion is premièred in Basel.
First recording of Mahler's Symphony No. 9, a live performance by the Vienna Philharmonic conducted by Bruno Walter at the Musikverein, the same location, conductor and orchestra that had presented the première 26 years earlier, but now in the face of the Anschluss.
May 12 – Arthur Honegger's oratorio Jeanne d'Arc au Bûcher is premièred in Basel, with Ida Rubinstein as Jeanne.
June 5 – Glenn Gould plays in public for the first time at a church service held at the Business Men's Bible Class in Uxbridge, Ontario to a congregation of about two thousand people.
September 22
 Anton Webern's String Quartet is premièred in Pittsfield, Massachusetts.
 Olsen and Johnson's musical comedy revue Hellzapoppin begins its 3-year run on Broadway.
October 5 – Ralph Vaughan Williams' Serenade to Music is premièred at the Royal Albert Hall in London to mark the 50th anniversary of conductor Henry Wood's first concert.
October 31 – Sister Rosetta Tharpe makes her first recording.
 December 17 – Consolidated Film Industries, Inc. consummates the sale of its subsidiary American Record Corp. to Columbia Broadcasting on December 17, 1938, for a reported price of $700,000. American Record embraces the Brunswick, Vocalion and Columbia labels.
December 30 – The ballet Romeo and Juliet (with music by Prokofiev) receives its first full performance, at the Mahen Theatre in Brno, Czechoslovakia.
 In West Java, Daeng Soetigna tunes the traditional pentatonic angklung to play the diatonic scale.
 Composer Ralph Vaughan Williams begins an affair with Ursula Wood.
 Roy Acuff and the Crazy Tennesseans win a contract with the Grand Ole Opry.
 Pete Seeger drops out of college to begin his career as a folk singer.
 Jelly Roll Morton speaks, sings, and plays piano for an eight-hour Library of Congress recorded sound documentary produced by Alan Lomax.
 Fred Buscaglione and Leo Chiosso meet.
 The Andrews Sisters enjoy their first major hit with "Bei Mir Bist Du Schoen".
 John Serry Sr. appears with Shep Fields in Paramount Pictures film extravaganza The Big Broadcast of 1938.
 Roman Catholic hymnal Kirchenlied first published in Germany.

Albums released
Carnegie Hall Jazz Concert – Benny Goodman

Top popular recordings

The twenty popular records listed below were extracted from Joel Whitburn's Pop Memories 1890–1954, record sales reported on the "Discography of American Historical Recordings" website, and other sources as specified. Numerical rankings are approximate, they are only used as a frame of reference.

Top Christmas hits
"Don't Wait 'Till The Night Before Christmas" – Eddy Duchin and His Orchestra

Top blues records 
"Sunnyland" – Sonny Boy Williamson

Published popular music

 "And the Angels Sing" words: Johnny Mercer, music: Ziggy Elman
 "At Long Last Love" w.m. Cole Porter
 "At The Roxy Music Hall" w. Lorenz Hart m. Richard Rodgers
 "Back Bay Shuffle" m. Artie Shaw & Teddy McRae
 "Be A Good Scout" w. Harold Adamson m. Jimmy McHugh Introduced by Deanna Durbin in the film That Certain Age
 "Big Noise From Winnetka" w.m. Ray Bauduc, Bob Crosby, Bob Haggart & Gil Rodin
 "The Biggest Aspidistra In The World" w.m. Thomas Connor, W. G. Haines & James S. Hancock
 "Bolero at the Savoy" w.m. Charles Carpenter, Gene Krupa & James Mundy
 "Boum!" w.m. E. Ray Goetz & Charles Trenet
 "Boomps-A-Daisy" w.m. Annette Mills
 "Boum!" w.m. Charles Trenet
 "Change Partners" w.m. Irving Berlin introduced by Fred Astaire in Carefree
 "Cherokee" m. Ray Noble
 "Cinderella, Stay In My Arms" w. Jimmy Kennedy m. Michael Carr
 "Colorado Sunset" w. L. Wolfe Gilbert m. Con Conrad
 "Daydreaming (All Night Long)" w. Johnny Mercer m. Harry Warren. Introduced by Rudy Vallée in the film Gold Diggers in Paris.
 "Dearest Love" w.m. Noël Coward
 "Deep In A Dream" w. Eddie DeLange m. Jimmy Van Heusen
 "Do You Wanna Jump Children?" w.m. Jimmy Van Heusen, Willie Bryant & Victor Selsman
 "Doin' the Jive" m.w. Glenn Miller & Chummy MacGregor
 "Don't Be That Way" w. Mitchell Parish m. Edgar Sampson & Benny Goodman
 "Don't Let That Moon Get Away" w. Johnny Burke m. James V. Monaco
 "Don't Worry 'Bout Me" w. Ted Koehler m. Rube Bloom
 "Double Trouble" w. Leo Robin m. Ralph Rainger & Richard A. Whiting
 "Exhibition Swing" m. Chalmers Wood
 "F.D.R. Jones" w.m. Harold Rome. Introduced by Rex Ingram in the revue Sing Out the News.
 "Falling In Love With Love" w. Lorenz Hart m. Richard Rodgers. Introduced by Muriel Angelus in the musical The Boys from Syracuse. Performed in the 1940 film by Allan Jones.
 "Ferdinand the Bull" w. Larry Morey m. Albert Hay Malotte. Performed by Sterling Holloway in the animated film of the same name.
 "Flat Foot Floogie (with a Floy Floy)" w.m. Slim Gaillard, Slam Stewart & Bud Green
 "Get Out of Town" w.m. Cole Porter from the musical Leave It to Me!
 "Hawaiian War Chant" w. (Eng) Ralph Freed m. Johnny Noble & Prince Leleiohaku
 "Heart And Soul" w. Frank Loesser m. Hoagy Carmichael
 "Hi-Yo Silver" Erickson, De Leath
 "Hold Tight – Hold Tight" w.m. Leonard Kent, Edward Robinson, Leonard Ware, Jerry Brandow & Willie Spotswood
 "Hong Kong Blues" w.m. Hoagy Carmichael
 "Hooray for Hollywood" w. Johnny Mercer m. Richard A. Whiting
 "I Can Dream, Can't I?" w. Irving Kahal m. Sammy Fain. Performed by Tamara in the 1938 musical Right This Way
 "I Hadn't Anyone Till You" w.m. Ray Noble
 "I Have Eyes" w. Leo Robin m. Ralph Rainger
 "I Let a Song Go Out of My Heart" w. Henry Nemo, John Redmond & Irving Mills m. Duke Ellington
 "I Love To Whistle" Harold Adamson, Jimmy McHugh
 "I Married An Angel" w. Lorenz Hart m. Richard Rodgers
 "I Must See Annie Tonight" w.m. Cliff Friend & Dave Franklin
 "I'll Be Seeing You" w. Irving Kahal m. Sammy Fain
 "I'll Tell the Man in the Street" w. Lorenz Hart m. Richard Rodgers. Introduced by Vivienne Segal and Walter Slezak in the musical I Married an Angel. Performed in the film version by Nelson Eddy.
 "I'm Gonna Lock My Heart" w. Jimmy Eaton m. Terry Shand
 "I'm In Love With Vienna" w. Oscar Hammerstein II m. Johann Strauss II
 "In A Little Toy Sailboat" Mandell, Littau
 "In My Little Red Book" w.m. Ray Bloch, Nat Simon & Al Stillman.
 "I've Got a Pocketful of Dreams" w. Johnny Burke m. James V. Monaco
 "Jeepers Creepers" w. Johnny Mercer m. Harry Warren. Introduced by Louis Armstrong in the film Going Places.
 "Joseph! Joseph!" w.(Eng) Sammy Cahn & Saul Chaplin m. Nellie Casman & Samuel Steinberg
 "Jumpin' at the Woodside" m. Count Basie
 "Just Let Me Look at You" w. Dorothy Fields m. Jerome Kern. Introduced by Irene Dunne in the film Joy of Living
 "Knees Up Mother Brown" w.m. Harris Weston & Bert Lee
 "Love Walked In" w. Ira Gershwin m. George Gershwin
 "March of the Bob Cats" m. The Bob Cats
 "Mister Crosby And Mister Mercer" w. Johnny Mercer m. Ed Gallagher & Al Shean
 "Moments Like This" w. Frank Loesser m. Burton Lane. Introduced by Florence George in the film College Swing.
 "Most Gentlemen Don't Like Love" w.m. Cole Porter. Introduced by Sophie Tucker in the musical Leave It to Me!
 "Music, Maestro, Please" w. Herb Magidson m. Allie Wrubel
 "My Heart Belongs to Daddy" w.m. Cole Porter. Introduced by Mary Martin in the musical Leave It to Me!. Miss Martin also performed it in the 1946 film Night and Day. Marilyn Monroe sang the song in the 1960 film Let's Make Love.
 "My Heart Is Taking Lessons" w. Johnny Burke m. James V. Monaco. Introduced by Bing Crosby in the film Doctor Rhythm
"My Heaven On Earth" w. Charles Tobias m. Phil Baker & Samuel Pokrass. Introduced by Gertrude Niesen in the film Start Cheering
 "My Own" w. Harold Adamson m. Jimmy McHugh from the film That Certain Age
 "My Reverie" w.m. Larry Clinton
 "Nice People" w.m. Nat Mills & Fred Malcolm
 "Nightmare" m. Artie Shaw
 "Now it Can Be Told" w.m. Irving Berlin
 "Oh! Ma-Ma!" w. (Eng) Lew Brown & Rudy Vallée m. Paolo Citorello
 "One Day When We Were Young" w. Oscar Hammerstein II m. Johann Strauss II arr. Tiomkin
 "The One I Love Will Come Along Some Day" w. Gus Kahn m. Bronislaw Kaper & Walter Jurmann. Introduced by Allan Jones in the film Everybody Sing
 "Paradise In The Moonlight" w.m. Gene Autry & Fred Rose from the film Western Jamboree
 "Penny Serenade" w. Hal Halifax m. Melle Weersma
 "Please Be Kind" w.m. Sammy Cahn & Saul Chaplin
 "Ride, Tenderfoot, Ride" w. Johnny Mercer m. Richard A. Whiting
"Rockin' The Town" w. Ted Koehler m. Johnny Green from the film Start Cheering
 "San Antonio Rose" m. Bob Wills
 "Says My Heart" w. Frank Loesser m. Burton Lane. Introduced by Harriet Hilliard with Harry Owens & his Orchestra in the film Cocoanut Grove
 "Sent for You Yesterday, and Here You Come Today" w.m. Count Basie, Eddie Durham & Jimmy Rushing
 "September Song" w. Maxwell Anderson m. Kurt Weill
 "Shadows on the Moon" w. Gus Kahn m. Sigmund Romberg from the film The Girl Of The Golden West
 "Sing for Your Supper" w. Lorenz Hart m. Richard Rodgers. Introduced by Marcy Westcott, Muriel Angelus and Wynn Murray in the musical The Boys from Syracuse. Performed in the 1940 film by Martha Raye.
 "Small Fry" w. Frank Loesser m. Hoagy Carmichael. Introduced by Bing Crosby, Fred MacMurray and Donald O'Connor in the film Sing You Sinners.
 "Sold American" m. Glenn Miller & Chummy MacGregor
 "Spring Is Here" w. Lorenz Hart m. Richard Rodgers. Introduced by Dennis King and Vivienne Segal in the musical I Married an Angel
 "Start Cheering" w. Milton Drake m. Ben Oakland. Introduced by Gertrude Niesen in the film Start Cheering.
 "The Stately Homes Of England" w.m. Noël Coward
 "Thanks for the Memory" w. Leo Robin m. Ralph Rainger
 "That Certain Age" w. Harold Adamson m. Jimmy McHugh from the film That Certain Age
 "This Can't Be Love" w. Lorenz Hart m. Richard Rodgers
 "This Is My Night To Dream" w. Johnny Burke m. James V. Monaco
 "Ti-Pi-Tin" w. (English) Raymond Leveen, w. (Spanish) María Grever, m. María Grever
 "Two Sleepy People" w. Frank Loesser m. Hoagy Carmichael
 "The Umbrella Man" w. James Cavanaugh m. Vincent Rose & Larry Stock
 "Undecided" w. Sid Robin m. Charlie Shavers
 "We're Off to See the Wizard" w. E. Y. Harburg m. Harold Arlen
 "When I Strut Away In My Cutaway" w.m. Jimmy Durante from the film Start Cheering
 "Where Are the Songs We Sung?" w.m. Noël Coward
 "Where the Dog Sits on the Tuckerbox" w.m. Jack O'Hagan
 "While a Cigarette Was Burning" w.m. Charles Kenny & Nick Kenny
 "Who Are We to Say? (Obey Your Heart)" w. Gus Kahn m. Sigmund Romberg from the film The Girl Of The Golden West
 "You Couldn't Be Cuter" w. Dorothy Fields m. Jerome Kern Introduced by Irene Dunne in the film Joy of Living
 "You Go To My Head" w. Haven Gillespie m. J. Fred Coots
 "You Leave Me Breathless" w. Ralph Freed m. Friedrich Hollaender. Introduced by Fred MacMurray in the film Cocoanut Grove.
 "You Must Have Been A Beautiful Baby" w. Johnny Mercer m. Harry Warren
 "You're A Sweet Little Headache" w. Leo Robin m. Ralph Rainger
 "You're As Pretty As A Picture" w. Harold Adamson m. Jimmy McHughfrom the film That Certain Age
 "You're What's The Matter With Me" w.m. Jimmy Kennedy and Michael Carr. Introduced by Harry Richman and Evelyn Dall in the film Kicking the Moon Around.

Classical music

Premieres
{| class="wikitable sortable"
|-
! Composer !! Composition !! Date !! Location !! Performers
|-
| Barber, Samuel || Adagio for Strings || 1938-11-05 || New York City || NBC Symphony – Toscanini 
|-
| Britten, Benjamin || Piano Concerto || 1938-08-18 || London (BBC Proms) || Britten / BBC Symphony – Wood
|-
| Bush, Alan || Piano Concerto, with baritone and chorus || 1938-03-04 || London || Bush, Noble / BBC Symphony – Boult
|-
| Copland, Aaron || An Outdoor Overture || 1938-12-16 || New York City || High School of Music & Art Orchestra, Alexander Richter (conductor)
|-
| Copland, Aaron || Signature || 1938-02-23 || New York City || High-Low Chamber Orchestra – Karman
|-
| Dallapiccola, Luigi || Sei cori di Michelangelo Buonarroti il giovane || 1938-04-26 || Prague || [unknown ensemble] – Kabelác
|-
| Enescu, George || Piano Sonata No. 3 || 1938-12-06 || Salle Gaveau, Paris || Marcel Ciampi
|-
| Ginastera, Alberto || Cantos del Tucumán || 1938-07-26 || Buenos Aires || Frías de López Buchardo, [unknown ensemble] 
|-
| Jolivet, André || Ouverture Rondeau for four ondes Martenot, two pianos and percussion || 1938-06-02 || Paris || Lesur, Steytler, Berthier, Breitner, Stein, Chapiro, Carasso – Evrard
|-
| Jolivet, André || Poèmes pour le enfant || 1938-05-12 || Paris || Croiza / [unknown ensemble] – Désormière<ref>{{IRCAM work|id=35057|title='Poèmes pour l'enfant, André Jolivet}}</ref>
|-
| Jolivet, André || Suite for String Trio || 1938-11-24 || Paris || Trio Pasquier
|-
| Krenek, Ernst || Piano Concerto No. 2 || 1938-03-17 || Amsterdam || Krenek / Concertgebouw Orchestra – Walter
|-
| Piston, Walter || Symphony No. 1 || 1938-04-08 || Boston || Boston Symphony – Piston 
|-
| Revultas, Silvestre || Sensemayá || 1938-12-15 || Mexico City || [unknown orchestra] – Revueltas 
|-
| Rubbra, Edmund || Symphony No. 2 || 1938-12-16 || London || BBC Symphony – Rubbra
|-
| Schoenberg, Arnold || Orchestration of Johannes Brahms' Piano Quartet || 1938-05-07 || Los Angeles || Los Angeles Philharmonic – Klemperer
|-
| Shostakovich, Dmitri || String Quartet No. 1 || 1938-10-10 || Leningrad || Glazunov Quartet
|-
| Shostakovich, Dmitri || Suite for Jazz Orchestra No. 2 || 1938-11-28 || Moscow || USSR State Jazz Band
|-
| Stravinsky, Igor || Dumbarton Oaks Concerto || 1938-05-08 || Washington DC || [unknown ensemble] – Boulanger
|-
| Tippett, Michael || Piano Sonata No. 1 || 1938-11-11 || London || Sellick
|-
| Webern, Anton || Das Augenlicht || 1938-06-17 || London (ISCM 38) || BBC Symphony Orchestra and Chorus – Scherchen
|-
|}

Compositions
Jean Absil – Concerto for Piano and Orchestra No. 1
Alan Bush – Piano Concerto, Op. 18, with baritone and male choir in last movement
Aaron Copland – Billy the Kid (ballet)Hanns Eisler – Roman CantataGeorge Enescu – Orchestral Suite No. 3 "Villageoise" in D major, Op. 27
Hamilton Harty – The Children of LirRoy Harris – Symphony No. 3
Herbert Howells – Hymnus ParadisiJanis Ivanovs – Symphony No. 3
Frank Martin – Sonata da chiesa
Carl Orff – Carmina BuranaWalter Piston – Symphony No. 1
Silvestre Revueltas – Sensemayá (Canto para matar una culebra [Chant for the Killing of a Snake])
Dmitri Shostakovich – String Quartet No. 1
Ernst Toch – Cantata of Bitter HerbsHeitor Villa-Lobos – String Quartet No. 6 (Quarteto brasileiro no. 2)
Leó Weiner – Divertimento for Strings No. 2

Opera
Jenő Ádám – Mária VeronikaPaul Frederic Bowles – Denmark VeseyPaul Hindemith – Mathis der MalerDmitri Kabalevsky – Colas BreugnonJeronimas Kacinskas – NonetErnst Krenek – Karl V (composed 1931–33), Neues Deutsches Theater in Prague, 22 June 1938
Mark Lothar – Tailor WibbelDouglas Stuart Moore – The Devil and Daniel WebsterFilm
George Gershwin – The Goldwyn FolliesErich Korngold – The Adventures of Robin HoodSergei Prokofiev – Alexander Nevsky (film)Jazz

Musical theatre
 The Boys from Syracuse (Richard Rodgers and Lorenz Hart) – Broadway production opened at the Alvin Theatre on November 23 and ran for 235 performances
 Great Lady Broadway production opened at the Majestic Theatre on December 1 and ran for only 20 performances
 Maritza aka Countess Maritza, London production opened at the Palace Theatre on July 6
 The Fleet's Lit Up, London opened at the London Hippodrome and ran for 191 performances
 Hellzapoppin', Broadway revue opened at the 46th Street Theatre on September 22 and ran for 1404 performances
 I Married an Angel, Broadway production opened at the Sam S. Shubert Theatre on May 11 and ran for 338 performances
 Knickerbocker Holiday, Broadway production opened at the Ethel Barrymore Theatre on October 19 and ran for 168 performances
 Leave It to Me!, Broadway production opened at the Imperial Theatre on November 9 and ran for 291 performances
 Nine Sharp, London production opened at The Little Theatre on January 26 and ran for 405 performances
 Operette, London production opened at His Majesty's Theatre on March 16
 Right This Way, Broadway production opened at the 46th Street Theatre on January 5 and ran for 14 performances
 Sing Out The News, Broadway revue opened at the Music Box Theatre on September 24 and ran for 105 performances
 These Foolish Things London revue opened at the Palladium on September 29
 You Never Know, Broadway production opened at the Winter Garden Theatre on September 21 and ran for 78 performances

Musical films
 The Big Broadcast of 1938, starring W. C. Fields, Bob Hope, Dorothy Lamour and Martha Raye
 Carefree, starring Fred Astaire and Ginger Rogers
 Champagnegaloppen, starring Svend Methling and Valdemar Møller.
 Cocoanut Grove, starring Fred MacMurray, Harriet Hilliard, Ben Blue and Eve Arden.
 Cowboy from Brooklyn, starring Dick Powell and Priscilla Lane
 Doctor Rhythm, starring Bing Crosby, Mary Carlisle and Beatrice Lillie.
 Dos amigos y un amor, directed by Lucas Demare
 Es leuchten die Sterne, starring Ernst Fritz Fürbringer and Fridtjof Mjøen
 Freshman Year, starring Constance Moore, William Lundigan and Dixie Dunbar. Directed by Frank McDonald.
 The Girl Of The Golden West, starring Jeanette MacDonald and Nelson Eddy
 Going Places, starring Dick Powell, Anita Louise, Allen Jenkins and Ronald Reagan and featuring Louis Armstrong and Maxine Sullivan
 Gold Diggers in Paris, starring Rudy Vallée, Rosemary Lane, Hugh Herbert and Allen Jenkins. Directed by Ray Enright.
 The Great Waltz, released November 4 starring Luise Rainer and Miliza Korjus. Oscar Hammerstein II contributed new English lyrics to the music of Johann Strauss IIHappy Landing, starring Sonja Henie, Don Ameche and Ethel Merman and featuring the Raymond Scott Quintet
 Hold That Co-ed, starring John Barrymore, George Murphy and Joan Davis
 Honeysuckle, starring Hugo del Carril and Libertad LamarqueIt's in the Air, starring George Formby, Polly Ward and Jack Hobbs. Directed by Anthony Kimmins.
 Jettatore, starring Tito Lusiardo, directed by Luis Bayon Herrera
 Joy of Living, starring Irene Dunne and Douglas Fairbanks Jr.
 Kicking the Moon Around, starring Bert Ambrose, Evelyn Dall, Harry Richman and Florence Desmond.
 Kilómetro 111, starring Delia Garcés and Pepe Arias, directed by Mario Soffici
 La Route Enchantée, starring Charles Trenet, directed by Pierre Caron
 La Valentina starring Jorge Negrete and Esperanza Baur
 Love Finds Andy Hardy starring Mickey Rooney and Judy Garland
 Mad About Music, starring Deanna Durbin. Directed by Norman Taurog.
 My Irish Molly, directed by Alex Bryce, starring Binkie Stuart, Tom Burke and Maureen O'Hara
 My Lucky Star, starring Sonja Henie, Richard Greene, Joan Davis and Art Jarrett
 Napoli d'altri tempi, starring Vittorio De Sica, Emma Gramatica and Elisa Cegani.
 Outside of Paradise, starring Phil Regan and Penny SingletonRadio City Revels, released February 11, starring Bob Burns, Jack Oakie and Kenny Baker and featuring Jane Froman performing with Hal Kemp's orchestra.
 Romance in the Dark, starring Gladys Swarthout, John Boles, John Barrymore and Claire Dodd. Directed by H. C. Potter.
 Sally, Irene and Mary, starring Alice Faye, Tony Martin, Fred Allen, Jimmy Durante, Joan Davis and Marjorie Weaver
 Sing You Sinners, starring Bing Crosby, Fred MacMurray and Donald O'Connor.
 The Singing Cop, starring Keith Falkner, Marta Labarr, Ivy St Helier and Bobbie Comber
 Start Cheering, released March 3, starring Jimmy Durante, Gertrude Niesen and the Three Stooges.
 Sweethearts, starring Jeanette MacDonald and Nelson Eddy
 That Certain Age, released October 7, starring Deanna Durbin. Songs by (lyrics) Harold Adamson and (music) Jimmy McHugh
 Tropic Holiday, released July 1, starring Bob Burns, Dorothy Lamour, Ray Milland and Martha Raye
 Volga-Volga, starring Lyubov Orlova, directed by Grigori Aleksandrov
 We're Going to Be Rich starring Gracie Fields, Victor McLaglen and Brian Donlevy

Births
January 6 – Adriano Celentano, singer-songwriter
January 8 – Yevgeny Nesterenko, opera singer and educator (died 2021)
January 11 – Narvel Felts, country singer
January 13
Daevid Allen, Australian musician (died 2015)
Paavo Heininen, Finnish composer
Shivkumar Sharma, santoor player
January 14
Jack Jones, singer
Allen Toussaint, songwriter and record producer (died 2015)
January 18 – Hargus "Pig" Robbins, session piano player
January 21 – Wolfman Jack, DJ (died 1995)
January 25
Etta James, blues singer (died 2012)
Vladimir Vysotsky, singer, songwriter, poet and actor (died 1980)
February 11
Edith Mathis, Swiss operatic soprano
Bobby "Boris" Pickett, singer ("Monster Mash") (died 2007)
February 16 – John Corigliano, composer
February 22 – Bobby Hendricks, R&B singer (The Drifters) (died 2022)
February 27
Mobarak Hossain Khan, surbahar player and musicologist (died 2019)
Jake Thackray, singer-songwriter (died 2002)
March 2
Simon Estes, operatic bass
Lawrence Payton, Motown tenor (The Four Tops) (died 1997)
March 5 – Paul Evans, singer and songwriter
March 3 – Douglas Leedy, composer (died 2015)
March 9 – Lill-Babs, pop singer (died 2018)
March 12 – Dimitri Terzakis, composer
March 13
Hans-Joachim Hespos, composer (died 2022)
Jean-Claude Risset, composer (died 2016)
March 18 – Charley Pride, country singer (died 2020)
March 25 – Hoyt Axton, country singer-songwriter and actor (died 1999)
April 2 – Booker Little, jazz trumpeter and composer (died 1961)
April 3 – Jeff Barry, songwriter
April 4 – Declan Mulligan, rock guitarist (The Beau Brummels) (died 2021)
April 7
Spencer Dryden, rock drummer (Jefferson Airplane, The Dinosaurs) (died 2005)
Freddie Hubbard, jazz trumpeter (died 2008)
April 13 – Frederic Rzewski, composer (died 2021)
April 19 – Jonathan Tunick, composer
April 26
Duane Eddy, guitarist
Maurice Williams, doo-wop vocalist (Maurice Williams and the Zodiacs)
April 29 – Klaus Voormann, rock guitarist, producer and sleeve designer (Manfred Mann)
May 4 – Tyrone Davis, singer (died 2005)
May 10
Henry Fambrough, R&B vocalist (The Spinners)
Maxim Shostakovich, orchestral conductor
May 11 – Bruce Langhorne, folk guitarist (died 2017)
May 13
 Dumitru Fărcaș, Romanian tárogató player (died 2018)
Frankie Smith, African-American doo-wop bass vocalist (The Monotones) (died 2000)
Lucille Starr, French-Canadian singer (died 2020)
May 15 – Lenny Welch, singer
May 26 – Teresa Stratas, operatic soprano
May 27 – Elizabeth Harwood, operatic soprano (died 1990)
May 28 – Prince Buster, ska musician (died 2016)
June 9 – Charles Wuorinen, composer (died 2020)
June 13 – Gwynne Howell, opera singer
June 14 – Julie Felix, folk singer (died 2020)
June 15 – Jean-Claude Éloy, composer
June 20 – Mickie Most, record producer (died 2003)
June 23 – Alan Vega, American rock singer, musician (Suicide) (died 2016)
June 24 – Edoardo Vianello, Italian singer and composer
June 26 – Billy Davis Jr., pop singer (The 5th Dimension)
July 1 – Pandit Hariprasad Chaurasia, bansuri player
July 4 – Bill Withers, singer-songwriter (died 2020)
July 5 – Ronnie Self, American singer-songwriter (died 1981)
July 9 – Paul Chihara, American composer
July 14 – Tommy Vig, Hungarian composer, arranger and vibraphonist
July 27 – Isabelle Aubret, singer
July 28 – George Cummings, rock guitarist and songwriter (Dr. Hook & The Medicine Show)
July 31 – Bonnie Brown (The Browns) (died 2016)
August 1 – Paddy Moloney, traditional Irish musician (The Chieftains) (died 2021)
August 4 – Simon Preston, organist (died 2022)
August 8 – Jacques Hétu, composer (died 2010)
August 13 – Dave "Baby" Cortez, pop keyboard player
August 21 – Kenny Rogers, country singer (died 2020)
August 23 – Roger Greenaway, singer-songwriter (David & Jonathan)
August 24
David Freiberg, rock musician (Quicksilver Messenger Service)
Mason Williams, guitarist and composer
August 26 – Jet Black, punk rock/new wave drummer (The Stranglers) (died 2022)
September 3 – Larry Grossman, composer of Broadway musicals
September 6 – Joan Tower, composer and singer
September 19 – Zygmunt Krauze, pianist and composer
September 21
Atli Heimir Sveinsson, composer (died 2019)
Yuji Takahashi, composer
September 28 – Ben E. King, singer (died 2015)
October 3 – Eddie Cochran, singer (died 1960)
October 15
Marv Johnson, singer (died 1993)
Fela Kuti, Afrobeat multi-instrumentalist (died 1997)
October 16 – Nico, singer-songwriter, actress and model (died 1988)
October 18 – Ronnie Bright, The Coasters (died 2015)
November 2 – Jay Black (Jay and the Americans) (died 2021)
November 4 – Harry Elston (Friends Of Distinction)
November 6
Jim Pike (The Lettermen) (died 2019)
P. J. Proby, singer
November 7 – Dee Clark, soul singer (died 1990)
November 16 – Troy Seals, singer, songwriter
November 17 – Gordon Lightfoot, singer-songwriter
November 19 – Hank Medress, doo-wop vocalist and producer (The Tokens) (died 2007)
December 1 – Sandy Nelson, drummer (died 2022)
December 5 – J. J. Cale, singer-songwriter (died 2013)
December 8 – Bernie Krause, bioacoustician
December 10 – Yuri Temirkanov, conductor
December 11 – McCoy Tyner, jazz pianist (died 2020)
December 12 – Connie Francis, singer
December 15 – Fela Kuti, Afrobeat pioneer (died 1997)
December 18 – Chas Chandler, musician, record producer and manager (died 1996)
December 20 – John Harris Harbison, composer
December 24 – Mesías Maiguashca, composer
December 28 – Charles Neville (The Neville Brothers) (died 2018)date unknownFanta Damba, jalimosolu singer
Abdul Jabbar, singer (died 2017)
Atli Heimir Sveinsson, composer (died 2019)

Deaths
January 19 – Rosa Mayreder, feminist writer, artist and musician, 79
January 20 – Nikolai Zhilyayev, musicologist, 56
January 29 – Carl Venth, violinist and composer, 77
February 4 – Dominique Heckmes, composer and music critic, 59
February 25 – Růžena Maturová, operatic contralto, 68
February 27 – Gianni Bettini, phonograph maker (born 1860)
March 2 – Ben Harney, ragtime composer & entertainer, 65
March 12 – Lyda Roberti, actress and singer, 31 (heart attack)
March 18 – Cyril Rootham, composer, 62
April 5 – Reine Davies, actress and singer, 51 (heart attack)
April 8 – Joe "King" Oliver, jazz trumpeter & band leader, 52
April 12 – Feodor Chaliapin, operatic bass, 65
April 18 – Richard Runciman Terry, musicologist, 72
May 7 – Papa Charlie Jackson, blues musician, 50
June 26 – James Weldon Johnson, US songwriter, author, diplomat and educationalist, 67
July 9 – H. Benne Henton, American ragtime and early jazz saxophonist songwriter, 60
July 24 – Anatole Friedland, American composer and songwriter, 57
July 27 – James Thornton, English-born US songwriter and vaudeville comedian, 76
August 14 – Landon Ronald, pianist and composer, 65
August 16 – Robert Johnson, blues musician, 27 (suspected strychnine poisoning)
August 30 – James Scott, ragtime composer, 53
September 2 – Fleta Jan Brown Spencer, songwriter, composer, pianist, and singer, 56
September 4 – Oreste Candi, violin-maker, 72
September 8 – Agustín Magaldi, tango singer, 39
September 12 – Mary Elizabeth Turner Salter, American soprano singer and composer, 82
September 28 – Con Conrad, songwriter, 47
October 22 – May Irwin, vaudeville star, 76
October 23 – Fred Barnes, music hall entertainer, 53 (Tuberculosis)
October 27
Alma Gluck, soprano, 54 (liver failure)
Khadija Gayibova, Azerbaijani pianist, 45 (executed)
November 21 – Leopold Godowsky, pianist and composer, 68
December 10 – Mario Pilati, composer, 35
December 21 – James Milton Black, hymn-writer and choir-master, 82date unknownMinnie Egener, operatic mezzo-soprano (born 1881)
Attilio Salvaneschi, operatic tenor (born 1873)probable'' – Oskar Böhme, trumpeter and composer (born 1870)

References

 
20th century in music
Music by year